Perizomini is a tribe of geometer moths under subfamily Larentiinae. It was first proposed by Claude Herbulot in 1961. It contains four genera, including the eponymous Perizoma.

Genera
 Martania Mironov, 2000
 Mesotype Hübner, 1825
 Perizoma Hübner, 1825
 Pseudobaptria Inoue, 1982

References

External links

 
Larentiinae